Puya killipii is a species in the genus Puya. This species is native to Venezuela. A Puya killipii is a species of a flowering plant that belongs to the family Bromeliaceae. The  puya killipii is  widely distributed and found in the open rocky hillsides, at 3200-3300 m alt. The Puya Killipii is found on the northeastern side of Colombia and  adjacent to Venezuela.

References

Smith, L. B., & Downs, R. J. (1974). Pitcairnioideae (Bromeliaceae). Flora Neotropica, 14(1), 1–658. http://www.jstor.org/stable/4393694
 Smith, L. B. (1957). THE BROMELIACEAE OF COLOMBIA. Contributions from the United States National Herbarium, 33, I–311. http://www.jstor.org/stable/43793761  

killipii
Flora of Venezuela